The Way Way General Store is a historical and architecturally eclectic general store at 93 Buxton Road in Saco, Maine.  Built 1927-29, it has been operated since then by members of the Cousens family.  It was listed on the National Register of Historic Places in 1995 for its architecture and its role in the rural economy of northern Saco.

Description and history
It is an architecturally and visually eclectic two story structure, built out of hand-formed concrete blocks on the first floor, and shingled wood framing on the second. The first floor blocks are painted red and white in an alternating pattern, with the grout lines painted green. A porte cochere extends across the front of the store, supported by columns of fieldstone and topped by a balustrade. It shelters two c. 1940s "National" brand gasoline pumps, no longer in service. To the left side is a poured-concrete two-bay garage, whose walls have been scored and painted to mimic the main building's color scheme. The interior of the building retains all of its original layout, fixtures, and woodwork.

The store was built over a three-year period, between 1927 and 1929, by Eugene Cousens and his son Carrol.  The older Cousens had been selling gasoline from this property since 1916, and opened a small store in a wood frame building in 1924.  With the construction of this building, Cousens began carrying a wider array of general merchandise, and became a mainstay of the relatively rural area.  The garage bays were added in the 1930s, where Carrol Cousens serviced automobiles until the 1950s.  As of the store's listing on the National Register in 1995, the property remains in the hands of Cousens' daughters.

See also
National Register of Historic Places listings in York County, Maine

References

Commercial buildings on the National Register of Historic Places in Maine
Buildings and structures completed in 1927
Buildings and structures in Saco, Maine
National Register of Historic Places in York County, Maine
General stores in the United States